Ernest Paul Bushmiller Jr.  (August 23, 1905 – August 15, 1982) was an American cartoonist, best known for creating the daily comic strip Nancy, which premiered in 1938 and features the title character who has remained in print for over 85 years. His work is noted for its simple graphic style. In 1976, he received the Reuben Award from the National Cartoonists Society for his work on Nancy.

Childhood and training
Born in the South Bronx, New York, Bushmiller was the son of immigrant parents, Ernest George Bushmiller Sr. and Elizabeth Hall, originally from Germany and Northern Ireland respectively. His father was an artist, vaudevillian and bartender. He briefly attended Theodore Roosevelt High School before leaving at 14 to work as a copy boy at the New York World newspaper, while attending evening art classes at the National Academy of Design. He ran errands for the staff cartoonists and was given occasional illustration assignments, including a Sunday feature by Harry Houdini.

Comic strips
In May 1925, cartoonist Larry Whittington, creator of the comic strip Fritzi Ritz, left to produce another strip, Mazie the Model. Bushmiller then took over, his name first appearing on the May 18 strip. Fritzi Ritz was expanded to a Sunday strip on October 6, 1929. Bushmiller had already been producing a comic strip for the New York Evening Graphic titled Mac the Manager.

Once he began to move away from Whittington's depiction of Fritzi, Bushmiller began to model her after his fiance, Abby Bohnet, the daughter of a train conductor. The couple, who married July 9, 1930, had no children. In 1931, they headed for Hollywood, where Bushmiller wrote gags for Harold Lloyd's Movie Crazy, continuing to draw Fritzi Ritz at the same time. A year later, they returned to the Bronx.

Bushmiller claimed in 1948 that "All my characters are conceived in desperation." He introduced Nancy, Fritzi's niece, to the strip on January 2, 1933. The character proved popular, so she appeared more often. As Aunt Fritzi was seen less frequently, the strip was eventually retitled Nancy in 1938. The popular strip was translated into various languages, including Italian, German, Swedish and Norwegian. Phil Fumble is a Bushmiller strip which ran from 1932 through 1938.

Bushmiller started working each day about 2pm, and he often sat at his drawing table well into the early morning hours of the next day. He usually began a strip with the last panel and then worked back toward the first panel. In 1960 he told a reporter:

The simplicity of his style brought praise from Art Spiegelman and other artists. Tom Smucker, writing in The Village Voice, observed:

As Paul Karasik and Mark Newgarden noted in their essay, "How to Read Nancy": 

Comics theorist Scott McCloud described the essence of Bushmiller and his creation:

In 1979, Bushmiller was diagnosed with Parkinson's disease, but he continued to produce the strip with the help of assistants Will Johnson and Al Plastino. He lived in Stamford, Connecticut, where he died in 1982.

Awards
Bushmiller, one of the founding members of the National Cartoonists Society, received its Humor Comic Strip Award and its Reuben Award in 1976 for his work on Nancy. In 2011, Bushmiller was listed as a Judges' Choice for The Will Eisner Award Hall of Fame.

Legacy
Nancy remains a recognised and popular character, drawn by other artists since Bushmiller's death, most recently by the pseudonymous 'Olivia Jaimes'. Bushmiller's work has been repeatedly addressed by other artists: Andy Warhol made a 1961 painting based on Nancy, and Joe Brainard made numerous works based on Nancy. Many cartoonists have produced work directly inspired by or commenting on Bushmiller's art, including Art Spiegelman, Mark Newgarden, Chris Ware and Zippy cartoonist Bill Griffith, who has also written an essay on Bushmiller.  Griffith revealed in the August 19, 2020 Zippy strip that he is writing and drawing a graphic biography of Bushmiller; it will be published in August 2023.

The American Heritage Dictionary uses a Bushmiller Nancy strip to illustrate its entry for "comic strip."

References

Further reading 
Strickler, Dave. Syndicated Comic Strips and Artists, 1924-1995: The Complete Index. Cambria, California: Comics Access, 1995.

External links
"Charting the Known: The Geography of Ernie Bushmiller"
"Confessions of a Nancy Addict" by William Swislow
The Bushmiller Society
Billy Ireland Cartoon Library & Museum Art Database

1905 births
1982 deaths
American people of German descent
American people of Northern Ireland descent
American comic strip cartoonists
People from the Bronx
Neurological disease deaths in Connecticut
Deaths from Parkinson's disease
Reuben Award winners
Will Eisner Award Hall of Fame inductees